Bougatsas, is a kind of a Greek folk dance from the city of Florina, Macedonia, Greece. It is danced in pairs.

See also
Music of Greece
Greek dances

References
Ελληνικοί παραδοσιακοί χοροί - Μπουγατσάς
Μακεδονία - Τα αρραβωνιάσματα ή  μπουγατσάς, ή διπλός

Greek dances
Macedonia (Greece)